Candela Andújar Jiménez (born 26 March 2000) is a Spanish professional footballer who plays as a forward for Costa Rican club Sporting FC. She appeared in Primera División for FC Barcelona and Valencia CF. She represented Spain at several youth and senior levels.

Club career

Barcelona
Born in Barberà del Vallès, Barcelona, Andújar began her career at the age of 7 as a goalkeeper in Barberá Andalucia, playing with boys. After 4 years she joined Sant Gabriel and spent a season there, this time in midfielder position and only alongside young girls. She started her career in Barcelona at the start of 2012–13 season, after she was discovered by the club's scouts for her performances in Catalonia's u-12 national team. In Barça she was employed more as a winger and a forward player. She played her first official match for the senior team on 6 December 2017 against Sevilla at the age of 17, after her consistent form in Barça B, where she had scored 11 goals in 12 matches, throughout the mid season.

In June 2020, Andújar signed a contract extension to continue with Barcelona until 2022.

Loan to Valencia
On 29 July 2021, Andújar joined Valencia on a one-year loan deal.

On 18 June 2022, she announced her retirement from football at the age of 22 via an Instagram post.

International career
Andújar was first invited to play for national u-16 team in February 2015, in a development tournament. She was a member of Spanish u-17 squads that achieved runner-up places of UEFA Women's Under-17 Championship in 2016 and 2017. Each time she earned a place on the team of the tournament.

Andújar was also one of the key players of u-17 national team in the 2016 U-17 Women's World Cup. At the end of the tournament she was one of the 10 candidates for the Golden Ball, which she lost to Fuka Nagano.

Honours

Barcelona B
 Segunda División, Group III: 2016–17

FC Barcelona
 Primera División: Winner, 2019–20
 UEFA Women's Champions League: Runner-up, 2018–19
 Supercopa Femenina: Winner, 2020

International

 FIFA U-17 Women's World Cup: Third place: 2016
 UEFA Women's Under-17 Championship: Runner-Up: 2016, 2017

References

External links
 
 
 
Profile at Txapeldunak.com 
Candela Andujar

2000 births
Living people
People from Vallès Occidental
Sportspeople from the Province of Barcelona
Sportswomen from Catalonia
Footballers from Catalonia
Spanish women's footballers
Women's association football forwards
FC Barcelona Femení B players
FC Barcelona Femení players
Primera División (women) players
Spain women's youth international footballers
21st-century Spanish women